A biological reserve (Rebio) in Brazil is a legally defined type of protected area of Brazil, a conservation unit that aims for full preservation of biota and other natural attributes without human interference. It may be visited only with prior approval of the responsible agency, and only for research or educational purposes.

Definition

A "Biological reserve" in Brazil is one of the Integral Protection Units defined by Article 13 of Law No. 9,985 of 18 July 2000, National System of Conservation Units (SNUG).
The biological reserve is public property.
When it is established any private lands within its limits are expropriated.
The manager of the biological reserve must prepare a management plan for approval by the responsible agency.
The approved management plan is accessible by the public.

This category of conservation unit aims at full preservation of biota and other natural attributes without direct human interference or environmental changes. 
The exception is for measures to recover altered ecosystems and management actions required to restore and preserve natural balance, biological diversity and natural ecological processes. 
Public access is prohibited with the exception of visits for educational purposes as defined in management plan. 
Research may be conducted after prior approval of the responsible agency and is also subject to the agency's conditions and restrictions.

Selected list

Notes

Sources

 

 
Lists of protected areas of Brazil
Types of protected area of Brazil